The M3 highway is a partially built road in Moldova, which links Chișinău to the southern part of the country via Gagauzia. The road forms part of the European routes E87 and E584 and will have a total length of  when completed. The road passes through Cimișlia and Comrat before reaching its southern terminus, at the border tripoint at Giurgiulești, where it connects with Romania's DN2B and Ukraine's M15 highway, respectively.

The parts of the road currently in service include the Chișinău - Porumbrei segment (32 km) and the Cimișlia - Giurgiulești section (161 km).

Construction works on the Chișinău - Cimișlia section of the M3 began during Soviet rule in the 1980s. They began to slow down after the dissolution of the Soviet Union in 1991, and stopped in 1996, with only 32 km opened to traffic between Chișinău and Porumbrei. Works resumed in 2019, and the section is set to receive motorway status upon completion, thus making M3 the first motorway in Moldova.

Near Comrat, there's a ramification of the M3 linking it to republican road R35; this road is designated the M3.1 and its total length is 4.3 km.

See also
Ungheni–Odesa motorway: another planned motorway in Moldova
Roads in Moldova
Transport in Moldova

References

Gallery

Roads in Moldova